Vacca is an Italian surname literally meaning "cow". Notable people with the surname include:

Andrea Vaccà Berlinghieri (1772–1826) Italian surgeon (sometimes referred to as Andrea Vacca)
Claudio Vacca (1915–1985), Argentine footballer
Charles Vacca, a shooting instructor who was shot and killed on August 25, 2014
Flaminio Vacca (1538–1605), Italian sculptor
Frank Vacca, American politician
Giovanni Vacca (mathematician) (1872–1953), Italian mathematician
Giovanni Vacca (physiologist), Italian physiologist
James Vacca, American politician
Tony Vacca (percussionist), American jazz drummer

Italian-language surnames